The metallic pigeon, (Columba vitiensis) also known as white-throated pigeon is a medium-sized, up to 37 cm long, bird in the family Columbidae.

Identification
The adult has an iridescent purple and green crown, black wing and uppertail coverts, yellowish red iris, yellow bill, red orbital skin, white or grey chin and ear coverts, and purplish feet. It has a dull chestnut or glossed purple green below, depends on subspecies. The nominate form C. v. vitiensis from Fiji has a dull underparts, while subspecies C. v. halmaheira of Maluku Islands has the most iridescent plumage. Both sexes are similar. The young is duller than adult.

Distribution
The metallic pigeon is distributed to tropical forests of eastern Indonesia, the Philippines, New Guinea, Solomon Islands, Fiji, New Caledonia, Samoa and surrounding southwest Pacific islands. A subspecies, the Lord Howe pigeon, used to exist on Lord Howe Island in Australia, but was exterminated by hunting c. 1853.

Food
The diet consists mainly of various fruits, grains, seeds and berries. The female usually lays one to two eggs.

Conservation
Widespread and common throughout its large range, the metallic pigeon is evaluated as being of Least Concern on the IUCN Red List of Threatened Species.

Gallery

References 

 Higgins, P.J.; & Davies, S.J.J.F. (Eds.). (1996). Handbook of Australian, New Zealand and Antarctic Birds. Volume 3. Snipe to Pigeons. Oxford University Press: Melbourne.

External links 
 BirdLife Species Factsheet

metallic pigeon
Birds of Melanesia
Birds of the Philippines
Birds of Wallacea
metallic pigeon
Taxa named by Jean René Constant Quoy
Taxa named by Joseph Paul Gaimard